In climate science, a tipping point is a critical threshold that, when crossed, leads to large and often irreversible changes in the climate system. If tipping points are crossed, they are likely to have severe impacts on human society. Tipping behaviour is found across the climate system, in ecosystems, ice sheets, and the circulation of the ocean and atmosphere.

Tipping points are often, but not necessarily, abrupt.

The geological record shows many abrupt changes that suggest tipping points may have been crossed in ancient times. It is possible that some tipping points are close to being crossed or have already been crossed, like those of the West Antarctic and Greenland ice sheets, the Amazon rainforest and warm-water coral reefs. A danger is that if the tipping point in one system is crossed, this could cause a cascade of other tipping points, leading to severe, potentially catastrophic, impacts.

Definition

The sixth report from the United Nations Intergovernmental Panel on Climate Change (IPCC), released in 2021, defines a tipping point as a "critical threshold beyond which a system reorganizes, often abruptly and/or irreversibly". It can be brought about by a small disturbance causing a disproportionately large change in the system. It can also be associated with self-reinforcing feedbacks, which could lead to changes in the climate system irreversible on a human timescale. For any particular climate component, the shift from one state to a new stable state may take many decades or centuries.

The 2019 IPCC Special Report on the Ocean and Cryosphere in a Changing Climate defines a tipping point as: "A level of change in system properties beyond which a system reorganises, often in a non-linear manner, and does not return to the initial state even if the drivers of the change are abated. For the climate system, the term refers to a critical threshold at which global or regional climate changes from one stable state to another stable state.".

In ecosystems and in social systems, a tipping point can trigger a regime shift, a major systems reorganisation into a new stable state. Such regime shifts need not be harmful. In the context of the climate crisis, the tipping point metaphor is sometimes used in a positive sense, such as to refer to shifts in public opinion in favour of action to mitigate climate change, or the potential for minor policy changes to rapidly accelerate the transition to a green economy.

Geological record 

The geological record shows that there have been abrupt changes in the climate system that indicate ancient tipping points. For instance, the Dansgaard–Oeschger events during the last ice age were periods of abrupt warming (within decades) in Greenland and Europe, that may have involved the abrupt changes in major ocean currents. During the deglaciation in the early Holocene, sea level rise was not smooth, but rose abruptly during meltwater pulses. The monsoon in North Africa saw abrupt changes on decadal timescales during the African humid period. This period, spanning from 15,000 to 5,000 years ago, also ended suddenly in a drier state.

Tipping elements 
Scientists have identified many elements in the climate system which may have tipping points. in the early 2000s the IPCC began considering the possibility of tipping points.

As of September 2022, nine core tipping elements and seven regional impact tipping elements were identified. Out of those, one regional and three core climate elements are estimated to likely pass a tipping point if global warming reaches , namely the Greenland ice sheet collapse, the West Antarctic ice sheet collapse, tropical coral reef die off, and the boreal permafrost abrupt thaw. Two further tipping points are forecast as likely if warming continues to approach : Barents sea ice abrupt loss, and the Labrador sea subpolar gyre collapse.

Greenland ice sheet disintegration 

The Greenland ice sheet is the second largest ice sheet in the world, and is three times the size of the American state of Texas. Due to global warming, the ice sheet is melting at an accelerating rate, adding almost 1 mm to global sea levels every year. Around half of the ice loss occurs via surface melting, and the remainder occurs at the base of the ice sheet where the ice sheet touches the sea, by calving (breaking off) icebergs from its margins.

The Greenland ice sheet has a tipping point because of the melt-elevation feedback. Surface melting reduces the height of the ice sheet. As air at a lower altitude is warmer, the ice sheet is then exposed to warmer temperatures, accelerating its melt. A 2021 analysis of sub-glacial sediment at the bottom of a  Greenland ice core finds that the Greenland ice sheet melted away at least once during the last million years, and therefore strongly suggests that its tipping point is below the  maximum temperature increase over the preindustrial conditions observed over that period. There is some evidence that the Greenland ice sheet is losing stability, and getting close to a tipping point.

West Antarctic ice sheet disintegration 

It sits on bedrock mostly below sea level. As such, it is in contact with the heat from the ocean which makes it vulnerable to fast and irreversible ice loss. A tipping point could be reached if thinning or collapse of the WAIS's ice shelves triggers a feedback loop that leads to rapid and irreversible loss of its ice into the ocean.

Ice loss from the WAIS is accelerating. The paleo record suggests that during the past few hundred thousand years, the WAIS largely disappeared in response to similar levels of warming and  emission scenarios projected for the next few centuries.

Like with the other ice sheets, there is a counteracting negative feedback - greater warming also intensifies the effects of climate change on the water cycle, which result in an increased precipitation over the ice sheet in the form of snow during the winter, which would freeze on the surface, and this increase in the surface mass balance (SMB) counteracts some fraction of the ice loss. In the IPCC Fifth Assessment Report, it was suggested that this effect could potentially overpower increased ice loss under the higher levels of warming and result in small net ice gain, but by the time of the IPCC Sixth Assessment Report, improved modelling had proven that the glacier breakup would consistently accelerate at a faster rate.

North Subpolar Gyre

East Antarctic ice sheet disintegration 

Its melt would also occur over a longer timescale than the loss of any other ice on the planet, taking no less than 10,000 years to finish. However, the subglacial basin portions of the East Antarctic ice sheet may be vulnerable to tipping at lower levels of warming.

Amazon rainforest dieback 

The Amazon rainforest is the largest tropical rainforest in the world. It is twice as big as India and spans nine countries in South America. It produces around half of its own rainfall by recycling moisture through evaporation and transpiration as air moves across the forest. When forest is lost via climate change (droughts and fires) or deforestation, there will be less rain and more trees will die. Eventually, large parts of the rainforest may die off and transform into a dry savanna landscape. In 2022, a study reported that the rainforest has been losing resilience since the early 2000s. Resiliency is measured by recovery-time from short-term perturbations. This delayed return to equilibrium of the rainforest is termed critical slowing down. The observed loss of resilience reinforces the theory that the rainforest is approaching a critical transition.

Permafrost thaw 

Perennially frozen ground, or permafrost, covers large fractions of land – mainly in Siberia, Alaska, northern Canada and the Tibetan plateau – and can be up to a kilometre thick. Subsea permafrost up to 100 metres thick also occurs on the sea floor under part of the Arctic Ocean. This frozen ground holds vast amounts of carbon from plants and animals that died and decomposed over thousands of years. Scientists believe there is nearly twice as much carbon in permafrost than is present in Earth's atmosphere. As the climate warms and the permafrost begins to thaw, carbon dioxide and methane are released into the atmosphere. With higher temperatures, microbes become active and decompose the biological material in the permafrost. This could happen rapidly, or over longer timespans, and the loss would be irreversible. Because  and methane are both greenhouse gases, they act as a self-reinforcing feedback on permafrost melt.

Atlantic Meridional Overturning Circulation 

The Atlantic Meridional Overturning Circulation (AMOC), also known as the Gulf Stream System, is a large system of ocean currents. It is driven by differences in the density of water; colder and more salty water is heavier than warmer fresh water. The AMOC acts as a conveyor belt, sending warm surface water from the tropics north, and carrying cold fresh water back south. As warm water flows northwards, some evaporates which increases salinity. It also cools when it is exposed to cooler air. Cold, salty water is more dense and slowly begins to sink. Several kilometres below the surface, cold, dense water begins to move south. Increased rainfall and the melting of ice due to global warming dilutes the salty surface water, and warming further decreases its density. The lighter water is less able to sink, slowing down the circulation.

Theory, simplified models, and reconstructions of abrupt changes in the past suggest the AMOC has a tipping point. If freshwater input from melting glaciers reaches a certain threshold, it could collapse into a state of reduced flow. Even after melting stops, the AMOC may not return to its current state. It is unlikely that the AMOC will tip in the 21st century, but it may do so before 2300 if greenhouse gas emissions are very high. A weakening of 24% to 39% is expected depending on greenhouse emissions, even without tipping behaviour. If the AMOC does shut down, a new stable state could emerge that lasts for thousands of years, possibly triggering other tipping points.

In 2021, a study which used a "primitive" finite-difference ocean model estimated that AMOC collapse could be invoked by a sufficiently fast increase in ice melt even if it never reached the common thresholds for tipping obtained from slower change. Thus, it implied that the AMOC collapse is more likely than what is usually estimated by the complex and large-scale climate models. Another 2021 study found early-warning signals in a set of AMOC indices, suggesting that the AMOC may be close to tipping. However, it was contradicted by another study published in the same journal the following year, which found a "largely stable" AMOC which had so far not been affected by climate change beyond its own natural variability. Two more studies published in 2022 have also suggested that the modelling approaches commonly used to evaluate AMOC appear to overestimate the risk of its collapse.

Arctic sea ice 

Arctic sea ice was once identified as a potential tipping element. The loss of sunlight-reflecting sea ice during summer exposes the (dark) ocean, which would warm. Arctic sea ice cover is likely to melt entirely under even relatively low levels of warming, and it was hypothesized that this could eventually transfer enough heat to the ocean to prevent sea ice recovery even if the global warming is reversed. Modelling now shows that this heat transfer during the Arctic summer does not overcome the cooling and the formation of new ice during the Arctic winter. As such, the loss of Arctic ice during the summer is not a tipping point for as long as the Arctic winter remains cool enough to enable the formation of new Arctic sea ice. However, if the higher levels of warming prevent the formation of new Arctic ice even during winter, then this change may become irreversible. Consequently, Arctic Winter Sea Ice is included as a potential tipping point in a 2022 assessment.

Additionally, the same assessment argued that while the rest of the ice in the Arctic Ocean may recover from a total summertime loss during the winter, ice cover in the Barents Sea may not reform during the winter even below  of warming. This is because the Barents Sea is already the fastest-warming part of the Arctic: in 2021-2022 it was found that while the warming within the Arctic Circle has already been nearly four times faster than the global average since 1979, Barents Sea warmed up to seven times faster than the global average. This tipping point matters because of the decade-long history of research into the connections between the state of Barents-Kara Sea ice and the weather patterns elsewhere in Eurasia.

Coral reef die-off 

Around 500 million people around the world depend on coral reefs for food, income, tourism and coastal protection. Since the 1980s, this is being threatened by the increase in sea surface temperatures which is triggering mass bleaching of coral, especially in sub-tropical regions. Under heat stress, corals expel the small colourful algae which live in their tissues, which causes them to turn white. The algae, known as zooxanthellae, have a symbiotic relationship with coral such that without them, the corals slowly die. After these zooxanthellae have disappeared, the corals are vulnerable to a transition towards a seaweed-dominated ecosystem, making it very difficult to shift back to a coral-dominated ecosystem.

Mountain glaciers 

Mountain glaciers are the largest repository of land-bound ice after the Greenland and the Antarctica ice sheets, and they are also undergoing melting as the result of climate change. A glacier tipping point is when it enters a disequilibrium state with the climate and will melt away unless the temperatures go down. Examples include glaciers of the North Cascade Range, where even in 2005 67% of the glaciers observed were in disequilibrium and will not survive the continuation of the present climate, or the French Alps, where The Argentière and Mer de Glace glaciers are expected to disappear completely by end of the 21st century if current climate trends persist. This would amount to one quarter and nearly half of mountain glacier *mass* loss, respectively, as only the largest, most resilient glaciers would survive the century. This ice loss would also contribute ~ and ~ to sea level rise, while the current likely trajectory of  would result in the SLR contribution of ~ by 2100.

The absolute largest amount of glacier ice is located in the Hindu Kush Himalaya region, which is colloquially known as the Earth's "Third Pole" as the result. Glacier melt is projected to accelerate regional river flows until the amount of meltwater peaks around 2060, going into an irreversible decline afterwards. Since regional precipitation will continue to increase even as the glacier meltwater contribution declines, annual river flows are only expected to diminish in the western basins where contribution from the monsoon is low: however, irrigation and hydropower generation would still have to adjust to greater interannual variability and lower pre-monsoon flows in all of the region's rivers.

Sahel greening

Boreal forest biome shift 
During the last quarter of the twentieth century, the zone of latitude occupied by taiga experienced some of the greatest temperature increases on Earth. Winter temperatures have increased more than summer temperatures. In summer, the daily low temperature has increased more than the daily high temperature. It has been hypothesized that the boreal environments have only a few states which are stable in the long term - a treeless tundra/steppe, a forest with >75% tree cover and an open woodland with ~20% and ~45% tree cover. Thus, continued climate change would be able to force at least some of the presently existing taiga forests into one of the two woodland states or even into a treeless steppe - but it could also shift tundra areas into woodland or forest states as they warm and become more suitable for tree growth.

These trends were first detected in the Canadian boreal forests in the early 2010s, and summer warming had also been shown to increase water stress and reduce tree growth in dry areas of the southern boreal forest in central Alaska and portions of far eastern Russia. In Siberia, the taiga is converting from predominantly needle-shedding larch trees to evergreen conifers in response to a warming climate. Subsequent research in Canada found that even in the forests where biomass trends did not change, there was a substantial shift towards the deciduous broad-leaved trees with higher drought tolerance over the past 65 years, and a Landsat analysis of 100,000 undisturbed sites found that the areas with low tree cover became greener in response to warming, but tree mortality (browning) became the dominant response as the proportion of existing tree cover increased. A 2018 study of the seven tree species dominant in the Eastern Canadian forests found that while  warming alone increases their growth by around 13% on average, water availability is much more important than temperature and further warming of up to  would result in substantial declines unless matched by increases in precipitation.

A 2021 paper had confirmed that the boreal forests are much more strongly affected by climate change than the other forest types in Canada and projected that most of the eastern Canadian boreal forests would reach a tipping point around 2080 under the RCP 8.5 scenario, which represents the largest potential increase in anthropogenic emissions. Another 2021 study projected that under the "moderate" SSP2-4.5 scenario, boreal forests would experience a 15% worldwide increase in biomass by the end of the century, but this would be more than offset by the 41% biomass decline in the tropics. While the temperate species which would benefit from such conditions are also present in the southern boreal forests, they are both rare and have slower growth rates.

Cuvette Centrale peatland

Equatorial stratocumulus clouds

Formerly considered tipping elements 

The possibility that the El Niño–Southern Oscillation (ENSO) is a tipping element had attracted attention in the past. Normally strong winds blow west across the South Pacific Ocean from South America to Australia. Every two to seven years, the winds weaken due to pressure changes and the air and water in the middle of the Pacific warms up, causing changes in wind movement patterns around the globe. This is known as El Niño and typically leads to droughts in India, Indonesia and Brazil, and increased flooding in Peru. In 2015/2016, this caused food shortages affecting over 60 million people. El Niño-induced droughts may increase the likelihood of forest fires in the Amazon. After tipping, the system would be in a more permanent El Niño state, rather than oscillating between different states. This has happened in Earth's past, in the Pliocene, but the layout of the ocean was significantly different from now. So far, there is no definitive evidence indicating changes in ENSO behaviour, and the IPCC Sixth Assessment Report concluded that it is "virtually certain that the ENSO will remain the dominant mode of interannual variability in a warmer world." Consequently, the 2022 assessment no longer includes it in the list of likely tipping elements.

The Indian summer monsoon is another part of the climate system which was considered suspectible to irreversible collapse in the earlier research. However, more recent research has demonstrated that warming tends to strengthen the Indian monsoon, and it is projected to strengthen in the future.

Methane hydrate deposits in the Arctic were once thought to be vulnerable to a rapid dissociation which would have a large impact on global temperatures, in a dramatic scenario known as a clathrate gun hypothesis. Later research found that it takes millennia for methane hydrates to respond to warming, while methane emissions from the seafloor rarely transfer from the water column into the atmosphere. IPCC Sixth Assessment Report states "It is very unlikely that gas clathrates (mostly methane) in deeper terrestrial permafrost and subsea clathrates will lead to a detectable departure from the emissions trajectory during this century".

Mathematical theory 

Tipping point behaviour in the climate can be described in mathematical terms. Three types of tipping points have been identified—bifurcation, noise-induced and rate-dependent.

Bifurcation-induced tipping 

Bifurcation-induced tipping happens when a particular parameter in the climate (for instance a change in environmental conditions or forcing), passes a critical level – at which point a bifurcation takes place – and what was a stable state loses its stability or simply disappears. The Atlantic Meridional Overturning Circulation (AMOC) is an example of a tipping element that can show bifurcation-induced tipping. Slow changes to the bifurcation parameters in this system – the salinity and temperature of the water – may push the circulation towards collapse.

Many types of bifurcations show hysteresis, which is the dependence of the state of a system on its history. For instance, depending on how warm it was in the past, there can be differing amounts of ice on the poles at the same concentration of greenhouse gases or temperature.

Early warning signals 
For tipping points that occur because of a bifurcation, it may be possible to detect whether a system is getting closer to a tipping point, as it becomes less resilient to perturbations on approach of the tipping threshold. These systems display critical slowing down, with an increased memory (rising autocorrelation) and variance. Depending on the nature of the tipping system, there may be other types of early warning signals. Abrupt change is not an early warning signal (EWS) for tipping points, as abrupt change can also occur if the changes are reversible to the control parameter.

These EWSs are often developed and tested using time series from the paleo record, like sediments, ice caps, and tree rings, where past examples of tipping can be observed. It is not always possible to say whether increased variance and autocorrelation is a precursor to tipping, or caused by internal variability, for instance in the case of the collapse of the AMOC. Quality limitations of paleodata further complicate the development of EWSs. They have been developed for detecting tipping due to drought in forests in California, and melting of the Pine Island Glacier in West Antarctica, among other systems. Using early warning signals (increased autocorrelation and variance of the melt rate time series), it has been suggested that the Greenland ice sheet is currently losing resilience, consistent with modelled early warning signals of the ice sheet.

Human-induced changes in the climate system may be too fast for early warning signals to become evident, especially in systems with inertia.

Noise-induced tipping 
Noise-induced tipping is the transition from one state to another due to random fluctuations or internal variability of the system. Noise-induced transitions do not show any of the early warning signals which occur with bifurcations. This means they are unpredictable because the underlying potential does not change. Because they are unpredictable, such occurrences are often described as a "one-in-x-year" event. An example is the Dansgaard–Oeschger events during the last ice age, with 25 occurrences of sudden climate fluctuations over a 500 year period.

Rate-induced tipping 
Rate-induced tipping occurs when a change in the environment is faster than the force that restores the system to its stable state. In peatlands, for instance, after years of relative stability, rate-induced tipping can lead to an "explosive release of soil carbon from peatlands into the atmosphere" – sometimes known as "compost bomb instability". The AMOC may also show rate-induced tipping: if the rate of ice melt increases too fast, it may collapse, even before the ice melt reaches the critical value where the system would undergo a bifurcation.

Cascading tipping points 

Crossing a threshold in one part of the climate system may trigger another tipping element to tip into a new state. Such sequences of thresholds are called cascading tipping points, an example of a domino effect. Ice loss in West Antarctica and Greenland will significantly alter ocean circulation. Sustained warming of the northern high latitudes as a result of this process could activate tipping elements in that region, such as permafrost degradation, and boreal forest dieback. Thawing permafrost is a threat multiplier because it holds roughly twice as much carbon as the amount currently circulating in the atmosphere. Loss of ice in Greenland likely destabilises the West Antarctic ice sheet via sea level rise, and vice-versa, especially if Greenland were to melt first as West Antarctica is particularly vulnerable to contact with warm sea water.

A 2021 study with three million computer simulations of a climate model showed that nearly one-third of those simulations resulted in domino effects, even when temperature increases were limited to  – the upper limit set by the Paris Agreement in 2015. The authors of the study said that the science of tipping points is so complex that there is great uncertainty as to how they might unfold, but nevertheless, argued that the possibility of cascading tipping points represents "an existential threat to civilisation". A network model analysis suggested that temporary overshoots of climate change – increasing global temperature beyond Paris Agreement goals temporarily as often projected – can substantially increase risks of climate tipping cascades ("by up to 72% compared with non-overshoot scenarios").

Impacts 

Tipping points can have very severe impacts. They can exacerbate current dangerous impacts of climate change, or give rise to new impacts. Some potential tipping points would take place abruptly, such as disruptions to the Indian monsoon, with severe impacts on food security for hundreds of millions. Other impacts would likely take place over longer timescales, such as the melt of the ice caps. The  of sea level rise from the combined melt of Greenland and West Antarctica would require moving many cities inland. These impacts could happen simultaneously in the case of cascading tipping points. A review of abrupt changes over the last 30,000 years showed that tipping points can lead to a large set of cascading impacts in climate, ecological and social systems. For instance, the abrupt termination of the African humid period cascaded, and desertification and regime shifts led to the retreat of pastoral societies in North Africa and a change of dynasty in Egypt.

A 2021 meta analysis on the potential economic impact of tipping points found that they raise global risk; the medium estimate was that they increase the social cost of carbon by about 25%, with a 10% chance of tipping points more than doubling it. The social cost of carbon reflects the economic damage from carbon emissions. It included a detailed table of the estimated additional impact from each tipping point per every tonne of carbon under the "intermediate" Representative Concentration Pathway 4.5. Since it was written before the publication of the IPCC Sixth Assessment Report and the 2022 assessment of tipping points, it includes some tipping points they no longer consider plausible, like methane hydrates and the Indian summer monsoon, and excludes the more recently identified ones like the Labrador-Irminger circulation.

The authors of the assessment responded to this criticism by noting that their assessment should be treated as the starting point in economic assessment of tipping points rather than the final word, and since most of the literature included in their meta-analysis lacks the ability to estimate nonmarket climate damages, their numbers are likely to be underestimates. They have also noted that if climate change is assumed to impact the economic growth rate rather than the base level of economic activity (which they consider unlikely, but still a possibility) then the social cost of carbon becomes nearly 100 times larger, while the impact of tipping points becomes around 3 times larger.

Runaway greenhouse effect 
A runaway greenhouse effect is a tipping point so extreme that oceans evaporate and the water vapour escapes to space, an irreversible climate state that happened on Venus. A runaway greenhouse effect has virtually no chance of being caused by people.

Venus-like conditions on the Earth require a large long-term forcing that is unlikely to occur until the sun brightens by a few tens of percents, which will take a few billion years.

See also
 Greenhouse and icehouse Earth
 Climate sensitivity
 Planetary boundaries
 World Scientists' Warning to Humanity

References

External links
 Global Systems Institute Tipping points research  at Exeter University
 The climate tipping points 2022 BBC radio documentary

Climate change feedbacks
Climatology
Politics of climate change